The 1923 Army Cadets football team represented the United States Military Academy in the 1923 college football season. In their first season under head coach John McEwan, the Cadets compiled a 6–2–1 record, shut out five of their nine opponents, and outscored all opponents by a combined total of 237 to 56.  In the annual Army–Navy Game, the Cadets and Midshipmen played to a scoreless tie at the Polo Grounds in New York City. 
 
Two Army players were recognized on the All-America team. Center Edgar Garbisch was selected as a first-team player by Tom Thorp and Percy Haughton and a second-team player by Athletic World magazine, Norman E. Brown and Davis Walsh.  Garbisch was later inducted into the College Football Hall of Fame. Guard August Farwick received second-team honors from Norman E. Brown and Tom Thorp.

Schedule

References

Army
Army Black Knights football seasons
Army Cadets football